The Elkhorn River is a river in northeastern Nebraska, United States, that originates in the eastern Sandhills and is one of the largest tributaries of the Platte River, flowing  and joining the Platte just southwest of Omaha, approximately  south and  west of Gretna.

The Elkhorn has several tributaries, including its own North and South forks, Logan Creek Dredge, Rock Creek and Maple Creek.

History

The Lewis and Clark Expedition encountered the Elkhorn River near its confluence with the Platte, and referred to it as the "Corne de Cerf".  Located a few miles north of the confluence is the Elkhorn Crossing Recreation Area. This public park, operated by the Papio-Missouri River Natural Resources District, marks the location where thousands of immigrants in the nineteenth century, bound for the west, camped while waiting to cross the river.

For years Logan Fontenelle and Joseph LaFlesche, young mixed-race men who worked with the Omaha people, owned the ferry that carried people, wagons and animals between the two river banks. LaFlesche had been adopted by Omaha chief Big Elk and named as his successor. Fontenelle, of Omaha-French descent, served the tribe as an interpreter in relations with the US Indian agent and negotiations with the government over cession of lands.

See also

 List of Nebraska rivers
 Mormon Trail

References

External links

Rivers of Nebraska
Rivers of Antelope County, Nebraska
Rivers of Sarpy County, Nebraska
Rivers of Douglas County, Nebraska
Rivers of Washington County, Nebraska
Rivers of Stanton County, Nebraska
Rivers of Madison County, Nebraska
Rivers of Dodge County, Nebraska
Rivers of Holt County, Nebraska
Rivers of Cuming County, Nebraska
Tributaries of the Platte River